Marinobacter vinifirmus is a Gram-negative, moderately halophilic, non-spore-forming and motile bacterium from the genus of Marinobacter which has been isolated from wine-barrel-decalcification wastewater in France.

References

Further reading

External links
Type strain of Marinobacter vinifirmus at BacDive -  the Bacterial Diversity Metadatabase

Alteromonadales
Bacteria described in 2006
Halophiles